Hadit  (sometimes Had) refers to a Thelemic deity. Hadit is the principal speaker of the second chapter of The Book of the Law (written or received by Aleister Crowley in 1904).

Descriptions 
Hadit identifies himself as the point in the center of the circle, the axle of the wheel, the cube in the circle, "the flame that burns in every heart of man, and in the core of every star," and the worshipper's own inner self. Hadit has been interpreted as the inner spirit of man, the Holy Ghost, the sperm and egg in which the DNA of man is carried, the Elixir Vitae. When juxtaposed with Nuit in The Book of the Law, Hadit represents each unique point-experience. These point-experiences in aggregate comprise the sum of all possible experience, Nuith.

Hadit, "the Great God, the lord of the sky," is depicted on the Stele of Revealing in the form of the winged disk of the Sun, Horus of Behdet (also known as the Behdeti). However, while the ancient Egyptians treated the Sun and the other stars as separate, Thelema connects the sun-god Hadit with every individual star. Furthermore, The Book of the Law says: "Every man and every woman is a star."

Hadit is the Secret Seed. In The Book of the Law he says; "I am alone: there is no God where I am.". He is "the flame that burns in every heart of man, and in the core of every star." He is identified with kundalini; in The Book of the Law he says, "I am the secret Serpent coiled about to spring: in my coiling there is joy. If I lift up my head, I and my Nuit are one. If I droop down mine head, and shoot forth venom, then is rapture of the earth, and I and the earth are one. There is great danger in me..."

Hadit is the Fire of Desire at the Heart of Matter (Nuit). The combination of the upward-pointing triangle of Hadit and the downward-pointing triangle of Nuit forms the Star of Spirit (the Hexagram). The union of the infinitely small Hadit and the infinitely great Nuit causes an explosive rapture which leads to samādhi.

History 
The earlier, Egyptian version, went by the name of Heru-Behdeti or Horus of Behdet (Edfu), Haidith in Greek. Thoth let him take the form of the solar disk to help a younger version of Horus—Re-Horakhty, or Ra-Hoor-Khuit—in a battle with Set and his army. Both versions of Horus appear in the Egyptian image that Thelemites call Stele 666, a Dynasty 25 or 26 offering stele formerly in the Boulaq Museum, but now in the Egyptian Museum in Cairo, also known as the Stele of Revealing.

See also 
Heru-ra-ha
Mark and space
Nu

References

Works cited

Other sources 

Free Encyclopedia of Thelema. Hadit. Retrieved Sept. 4, 2005.
</ref>

Further reading

Magic gods
New religious movement deities
Thelema